Akbash is a rural locality (a selo) in Bardymsky District, Perm Krai, Russia. The population was 540 as of 2010. There are 10 streets.

Geography 
Akbash is located 35 km west of Barda (the district's administrative centre) by road. Toykino is the nearest rural locality.

References 

Rural localities in Bardymsky District